This is an index of articles relating to electronics and electricity or natural electricity and things that run on electricity and things that use or conduct electricity.

0–9
16VSB –
2VSB –
32VSB –
4000 series –
4VSB –
555 timer IC –
7400 series –
8VSB

A
Absolute gain (physics) –
Access control –
Access time –
Acoustic coupler –
Adaptive communications –
Adder –
Adjacent-channel interference –
Alarm sensor –
Aliasing –
Allied Electronics –
Alternating current –
AM radio –
Amateur radio –
Ambient noise level –
American Radio Relay League (ARRL) –
Ammeter –
Ampere –
Amplifier –
Amplitude distortion –
Amplitude modulation –
Analog computer –
Analog decoding –
Analog –
Analog-to-digital converter –
Analogue switch –
Analysis of resistive circuits –
Angular misalignment loss –
Antenna –
Antenna aperture –
Antenna blind cone –
Antenna gain –
Antenna height above average terrain –
Antenna noise temperature –
Antenna theory –
Aperture (antenna) –
Aperture-to-medium coupling loss –
Apollo Guidance Computer –
Arithmetic and logical unit –
Armstrong oscillator –
ARRL –
Articulation score –
Astable –
Asymmetric Digital Subscriber Line –
Asynchronous communications system –
Asynchronous operation –
Asynchronous start-stop –
Atmospheric duct –
Atmospheric waveguide –
Attenuation –
Audible ringing tone –
Audio system measurements –
Audiophile –
Automatic call distributor –
Automatic gain control –
Automatic link establishment –
Automatic number identification –
Automatic sounding –
Automatic switching system –
Autovon –
Availability –
Avalanche diode –
Azimuth

B
Backplane –
Backscattering –
Back-to-back connection –
Backward channel –
Balance return loss –
Balanced line –
Balancing network –
Ball grid array –
Band gap –
Band-stop filter –
Bandwidth compression –
Bare particular –
Barrage jamming –
Baseband –
Battery (electricity) –
Baud –
Baudot code –
BCS theory –
Beam diameter –
Beam divergence –
Beam steering –
Beamwidth –
Beat frequency oscillator –
Bel –
Biconical antenna –
Big ugly dish –
Bilateral synchronization –
Billboard antenna –
Binary classification –
Binary multiplier –
Binaural recording –
Bipolar junction transistor –
Bipolar signal –
Bit inversion –
Bit pairing –
Bit robbing –
Bit stuffing –
Bit synchronous operation –
Bit-count integrity –
Bits per second –
Black facsimile transmission –
Black recording –
Blanketing –
Bluetooth –
Blu-ray Disc –
BNC connector –
Boresight –
Breadboard –
Bremsstrahlung –
Bridging loss –
Broadband Internet –
Broadband wireless access –
Broadband –
Broadcasting –
Burst transmission –
Busy hour –
Busy signal –
Bypass

C
Cable modem –
Cable television –
Caesium standard –
Call collision –
Call set-up time –
Call-second –
Capacitive coupling –
Capacitor –
Capture effect –
Carbon nanotube –
Card standards –
Carrier-sense multiple access with collision detection –
Carrier shift –
Carrier system –
Carrier wave –
Carrier-to-receiver noise density –
Carson bandwidth rule –
Cassegrain antenna –
Category 5 cable –
Cathode ray tube –
Central processing unit –
Chadless tape –
Channel –
Channel noise level –
Channel reliability –
Character-count integrity –
Characteristic impedance –
Charge-coupled device –
Chemical vapor deposition –
Chirp –
Chroma subsampling –
Circuit breaker –
Circuit noise level –
Circuit reliability –
Circuit restoration –
Circuit switching –
Circular polarization –
Circulator –
Citizens' band radio –
Cladding –
Clapp oscillator –
Clean room –
Clear channel –
Clearing –
Clipping –
Clock gating –
Clock signal –
Closed waveguide –
Closed-circuit television –
CMOS –
Coaxial cable –
Co-channel interference –
Code-division multiple access –
Code word –
Coherence length –
Coherence time –
Coherence –
Coherent differential phase-shift keying –
Coherer –
Coilgun –
Collinear antenna array –
Collinear antenna array –
Collins Radio –
Colpitts oscillator –
Combat-net radio –
Combinational logic –
Combined distribution frame –
Common base –
Common battery –
Common collector –
Common control –
Common emitter –
Commonality –
Common-mode interference –
Communications center –
Communications satellite –
Communications security –
Communications system engineering –
Communications system –
Communications-electronics –
Compact audio cassette –
Compatible sideband transmission –
Composite image filter –
Composite video –
Compulsator –
Computer –
Concentrator –
Conditioning equipment –
Conducted interference –
Conduction band –
Conductive coupling –
Connections per circuit hour –
Conservation of radiance –
Constant k filter –
Content delivery –
Contention –
Continuous Fourier transform –
Continuous operation –
Continuous wave –
Convolution –
Copper –
Cord circuit –
Corner reflector –
Cosmic noise –
Costas loop –
Coulomb's law –
Counter (digital) –
Coupling –
Covert channel –
Covert listening device –
CPU design –
CQD –
C-QUAM –
Critical frequency –
Cross product –
Crossbar switch –
Crosstalk –
Crystal filter –
Crystal radio receiver –
Current –
Current bias –
Current-to-voltage converter –
Cutback technique –
Cutoff frequency –
Cutoff wavelength

D
D region –
D-4 –
Data bank –
Data circuit terminating equipment –
Data compaction –
Data integrity –
Data link –
Data service unit –
Data terminal equipment –
Data transmission circuit –
Data –
Datasheet –
dBa –
dBm –
DBrn –
DDR SDRAM –
Degree of isochronous distortion –
Delay line –
Delta modulation –
Demand assignment –
Demand factor –
Demand load –
Demodulation –
Demodulator –
Departure angle –
Design objective –
Despun antenna –
Deviation –
Dial-up –
Diamagnetism –
Dielectric constant –
Dielectric strength –
Dielectric waveguide –
Dielectric –
Differential amplifier –
Diffraction –
Digital access and cross-connect system –
Digital Audio Tape –
Digital circuit –
Digital filter –
Digital multiplex hierarchy –
Digital radio –
Digital signal processing –
Digital signal processor –
Digital-to-analog converter –
Digital transmission group –
Digitizer –
DIN –
Diode –
DIP switch –
Dipole antenna –
Dipole –
Direct bandgap –
Direct broadcast satellite –
Direct current –
Direct distance dialing –
Direct ray –
Directional antenna –
Directional coupler –
Directive gain –
Direct-sequence spread spectrum –
Discrete Fourier transform –
Discrete –
Dispersion-limited operation –
Display device –
Distortion –
Distortion-limited operation –
Emergency locator beacon –
Distributed switching –
Diurnal phase shift –
Diversity reception –
DOD master clock –
Doping –
Double-sideband suppressed-carrier transmission –
Double-slit experiment –
Drift –
Drop and insert –
Dropout –
Dual access –
Dual impedance –
Dual in-line package –
Dual-modulus prescaler –
Dual-tone multi-frequency –
Duobinary signal –
Duplex –
Duty cycle –
DXCC –
Dynamic range

E
Earphone –
Earpiece –
Earth's magnetic field –
EDIF –
EEPROM –
Effective antenna gain contour –
Effective boresight area –
Effective data transfer rate –
Effective Earth radius –
Effective height –
Effective input noise temperature –
Effective isotropically radiated power –
Effective monopole radiated power –
Effective radiated power –
Effective transmission rate –
Efficiency factor –
E-layer –
Electric charge –
Electric current –
Electric field –
Electric motor –
Electric power transmission –
Electric power –
Electrical conduction –
Electrical conductivity –
Electrical connector –
Electrical current –
Electrical efficiency –
Element –
Electrical engineering –
Electrical generator –
Impedance –
Insulation –
Electrical length –
Load –
Electrical network –
Circuit –
Electrical resistance –
Electrical room –
Electrical signal –
Electricity distribution –
Electricity –
Electrochemical cell –
Electrochemistry –
Electrode –
Electrodynamics –
Electrolytic capacitor –
Electromagnetic environment –
Electromagnetic induction –
Electromagnetic interference control –
Electromagnetic pulse –
Electromagnetic radiation and health –
Electromagnetic radiation –
Electromagnetic spectrum –
Electromagnetic survivability –
Electromagnetism –
Electrometer –
Electron hole –
Electron –
Electronic amplifier –
Electronic color code –
Color code –
Electronic data processing –
Electronic deception –
Electronic design automation –
Electronic filter –
Filter –
Electronic imager –
Electronic mixer –
Electronic musical instrument –
Electronic oscillator –
Electronic power supply –
Electronic switching system –
Electronic tagging –
Electronic test equipment –
Electronic warfare support measures –
Electronics –
Electro-optic effect –
Electro-optic modulator –
Electro-optics –
Electrostatic discharge –
Electrostatics –
Emergency Locator Transmitter –
Emergency Position-Indicating Radio Beacon –
Emitter coupled logic –
End distortion –
Endurability –
Enhanced service –
Entropy encoding –
Equilibrium length –
Equivalent impedance transforms –
Equivalent noise resistance –
Equivalent pulse code modulation noise –
Error burst –
Error ratio –
Error-correcting code –
E-skip –
Examples of electrical phenomena –
Extremely Low Frequency (ELF) –
Eye pattern

F
Fab (semiconductors) –
Semiconductor device fabrication –
Facsimile converter –
Fading –
Fading distribution –
Fail safe –
Fall time –
Fan-beam antenna –
Farad –
Faraday cage –
Faraday constant –
Faraday's law of induction –
Far-field region –
Fault –
Fault management –
FCC registration program –
Federal Standard 1037C –
Feed horn –
Feedback –
Ferroelectric effect –
Ferromagnetism –
Field (physics) –
Field –
Field effect transistor –
Field strength –
FPGA Field programmable gate array –
Filled cable –
Filter design –
Filter (signal processing) –
Flip-flop –
Fluorescent lamp –
Flutter –
Flux –
Flywheel effect –
FM band –
FM improvement factor –
FM improvement threshold –
FM radio –
Forward error correction –
Fourier series –
Fourier transform (see also List of Fourier-related transforms) –
Four-wire circuit –
Four-wire terminating set –
Fractal antenna –
Frame –
Frame rate –
Frame slip –
Frame synchronization –
Framing bit –
Freenet –
Free-space loss –
Freeze frame television –
Frequency assignment –
Frequency averaging –
Frequency counter –
Frequency deviation –
Frequency frogging –
Frequency modulation synthesis –
Frequency modulation –
Frequency standard –
Frequency synthesiser –
Frequency –
Frequency-division multiplexing –
Frequency-exchange signaling –
Frequency-hopping spread spectrum –
Frequency-shift keying –
Fresnel equations –
Fresnel reflection –
Fresnel zone –
Front-to-back ratio –
Fuel cell –
Fuse (electrical)

G
Gallium arsenide –
Galvanic isolation –
Galvanometer –
Gateway –
Gating –
Gauss –
Geiger–Müller tube –
Gel electrophoresis –
Gemini Guidance Computer –
Gender changer –
Global Positioning System –
Global system for mobile communications –
GNU Radio –
Grade of service –
Graded-index fiber –
Ground constants –
Ground loop –
Ground plane –
Ground (electricity) –
Groundwave –
Guided ray –
Gyrator

H
Halftone characteristic –
Hall effect –
Hamming code –
Hamming distance –
Handoff –
Handshake (computing) –
Hard copy –
Hardware register –
Harmonic analysis –
Harmonic oscillator –
Harmonic –
Hartley oscillator –
H-channel –
Heat sink –
Helical antenna –
Helmholtz coil –
Henry (unit) –
Hertz –
Heterodyne repeater –
Heterodyne –
High frequency –
High-performance equipment –
High-speed circuit-switched data –
Hop –
Horn –
Hot-point probe –
Hybrid balance –
Hybrid circuit –
Hybrid coil –
Hybrid coupler –
Hysteresis

I
IEEE 315-1975 –
IEEE 802.11 –
IEEE 802.15 –
IEEE 802 –
Image antenna –
Image impedance –
Image frequency –
Image rejection ratio –
Image response –
Impedance matching –
In-band on-channel –
Incidental radiator –
Independent sideband –
Index of cooperation –
Inductive coupling –
Inductive reactance –
Inductor –
Industrial Computers –
Information transfer –
Information-bearer channel –
Infrared –
Input/output –
Insertion gain –
Insertion loss –
Inside plant –
Integrated circuit –
Intensity modulation –
Intentional radiator –
Intercept –
Interchange circuit –
Intercharacter interval –
Interconnect facility –
Interference –
Interferometry –
Intermediate-field region –
Intermodulation distortion –
International Electrotechnical Commission –
Interoperability –
Interposition trunk –
Intersymbol interference –
Inverse multiplexer –
Inverse-square law –
Ion pump –
Ionosphere –
ISM band –
Isochronous burst transmission –
Isochronous signal –
Isotropic antenna

J
Jam signal –
Jamming –
Jansky –
Jitter

K
Karnaugh map –
Kendall effect –
Key pulsing –
Kirchhoff's circuit laws –
Klystron –
Knife-edge effect

L
Laser –
Launch angle –
Launch numerical aperture –
Lead-lag effect –
Leaky mode –
Light bulb –
Light-dependent resistor –
Light-emitting diode –
Lightning –
Limiting –
Line code –
Linear-feedback shift register –
Linear regulator –
Lip synchronization –
List of telephony terminology –
Lists of video game companies –
LM741 –
Low noise amplifier –
Loading characteristic –
Loading coil –
Lobe –
Local battery –
Logic families –
Logic gate –
Logic –
Log-periodic antenna –
Long-haul communications –
Longitudinal redundancy check –
Long-tailed pair –
Long-term stability –
Loop –
Loop gain –
Loop-back –
Low frequency –
Low-performance equipment –
Lumped element model

M
Macroelectronics –
Magnet –
Magnetic-core memory –
Magnetic field –
Magnetic flux quantum –
Magnetic flux –
Magnetic levitation –
Magnetism –
Magneto-optic effect –
Magnetosphere –
Magnetron –
Main distribution frame –
Main lobe –
Manchester code –
Maser –
Mask work –
Master frequency generator –
Maximal-ratio combiner –
Maximum power –
Maximum usable frequency –
Maxwell coil –
Maxwell's demon –
Maxwell's equations –
m-derived filter –
Mean time between outages –
Mediation function –
Medium frequency (MF) –
Medium-power talker –
Medium wave –
Metal –
Michelson–Morley experiment –
Microelectronics –
Microphone –
Microwave auditory effect –
Microwave oven –
Microwave –
MIL-STD-188 –
Minimum bend radius –
Mode scrambler –
Mode volume –
Modem –
Modular synthesizer –
Modulation factor –
Modulation rate –
Modulation –
Molecular electronics –
Monostable –
Moore's law –
Morse code –
MOS Technology 6501 –
MOS Technology 6502 –
MOS Technology SID –
MOS Technology VIC-II –
Mu-law algorithm –
Multicoupler –
Multi-element dipole antenna –
Multimeter –
Multipath propagation –
Multiple access –
Multiple homing –
Multiplex baseband –
Multiplexer –
Multiplexing –
Multivibrator

N
N connector –
Nanotechnology –
Nanowire –
Narrative traffic –
Narrowband modem –
Narrowband –
National Electrical Code (US) –
Natural frequency –
Near-field region –
Negative resistance –
Negative-acknowledge character –
Net gain (telecommunications) –
Netlist –
Network administration –
Network architecture –
Network management –
Neural network –
Neutral direct-current telegraph system –
NI Multisim –
Nickel metal hydride –
Noise figure –
Noise (electronics) –
Noise power –
Noise temperature –
Noise weighting –
Noise-cancelling headphone –
Noise-equivalent power –
Non-return-to-zero –
Normalized frequency –
Norton's theorem –
NTSC –
Nuclear electromagnetic pulse –
Nuclear magnetic resonance –
Null (radio) –
Numbers station –
Numerical aperture –
Numerically controlled oscillator –
Nyquist interval

O
Off-hook –
Off-line –
Ohm (unit) –
Ohmmeter –
Ohm's law –
Oliver Heaviside –
Omnidirectional antenna –
One-way trunk –
On-hook –
On-line –
Open circuit –
Open spectrum –
Operational amplifier –
Optical density –
Optical fiber –
Optical path length –
Optical spectrum –
Optoelectronic –
Orthogonal frequency division modulation –
Orthomode transducer –
Oscilloscope –
Out-of-band signaling –
Outside plant –
Overflow –
Overhead information –
Overmodulation –
Override –
Overshoot (signal)

P
Packet switching –
Packet-switching node –
Paired disparity code –
PAL –
Par meter –
Parabolic antenna –
Parabolic microphone –
Parallel transmission –
Parasitic element (electrical networks) –
Parity bit –
Passband –
Passive radiator –
Patch bay –
Path loss –
Path profile –
Pauli exclusion principle –
PBER –
PCB layout guidelines –
Peak envelope power –
Peltier effect –
Performance measurement period –
Periodic antenna –
Periscope antenna –
Permeability –
Permittivity –
Personal Locator Beacon –
Phantom circuit –
Phantom loop –
Phase –
Phase distortion –
Phase jitter –
Phase modulation –
Phase noise –
Phase perturbation –
Phased array –
Phase-locked loop –
Phase-shift keying –
Philberth-Transformer –
Phone connector (audio) –
Photodiode –
Photoelectric effect –
Photolithography –
Photon –
Physical layer –
Pickup –
PID controller –
Piezoelectricity –
Pin grid array –
Pirate radio –
Planar array –
Planck's constant –
Plesiochronous Digital Hierarchy –
Point-to-point construction –
Polarential telegraph system –
Polarization –
Polling –
Polyphase system –
Portable people meter –
Potential difference –
Potential divider –
Power –
Power connector –
Power supply –
Preamplifier –
Preemphasis network –
Preemphasis –
Preferred values –
Preventive maintenance –
Primary channel –
Primary line constants –
Primary time standard –
Principal clock –
Printed circuit board –
Processor register –
Product detector –
Programmable logic device –
Propagation delay –
Propagation mode –
Propagation path obstruction –
Propagation of schema –
Proration –
Pseudorandom noise –
Pseudorandom number sequence –
PSK31 –
Pulse amplitude –
Pulse duration –
Pulse –
Pulse-address multiple access –
Pulse-code modulation –
Pulsed inductive thruster –
Pulse-width modulation –
Push-to-talk operation –
Push-to-type operation –
Pyroelectricity

Q
Q code –
QRP operation –
Q-switching –
Quadrature amplitude modulation –
Quadrature –
Quality assurance –
Quality control –
Quantum harmonic oscillator –
Quartz clock –
Quasi-analog signal –
Queuing delay

R
Race hazard –
Radar –
Radiation angle –
Radiation mode –
Radiation pattern –
Radiation resistance –
Radiator –
Radio beam –
Radio clock –
Radio electronics –
Radio frequency induction –
Radio frequency –
Radio horizon range –
Radio horizon –
Radio propagation –
Radio range –
Radio Row, Manhattan –
Radio station –
Radio –
RadioShack –
Radiotelephone –
Radioteletype –
Radix-64 –
Railgun –
Random-access memory –
Randomizer –
Ray transfer matrix analysis –
RC circuit –
RC –
RCA jack –
RCA –
Reactance –
Receive-after-transmit time delay –
Received noise power –
Receiver –
Receiver attack-time delay –
Reconnaissance satellite –
Record medium –
Reference antenna –
Reference circuit –
Reference clock –
Reference noise –
Reference surface –
Reflection coefficient –
Reflections of signals on conducting lines –
Reflective array antenna –
Refractive index contrast –
Regenerative circuit –
Register transfer level –
Registered jack –
Relational model –
Relative transmission level –
Relaxation oscillator –
Relay –
Release time –
Remote Operations Service Element protocol –
Remote sensing –
Repair and maintenance –
Repeater –
Repeating coil –
Reproduction speed –
Reradiation –
Resistor color code –
Resistor –
Resonance –
Response time –
Responsivity –
Return loss –
RF connector –
RF modulator –
RF power margin –
RF probe –
RF shielding –
RFID –
RGB color space –
Rhombic antenna –
Ring current –
Ring latency –
Ring modulation –
Ringback signal –
Ringdown –

RL circuit –
RLC circuit –
Robot –
Rogowski coil –
Root mean square –
Routing indicator –
RS-232 –
RX –
Rydberg formula

S
S/PDIF –
Sacrificial anode –
Sampling frequency –
Scalar field –
Scanner –
Scanning electron microscope –
SCART –
Schematic –
Schumann resonance –
Scrambler –
SECAM –
Second audio program –
Second-order intercept point –
Security management –
Self-clocking signal –
Self-synchronizing code –
Semiautomatic switching system –
Semiconductor device –
Semiconductor –
Sensitivity –
Sensor Networks –
Separate channel signaling –
Serial access –
Serial ATA –
Serial Peripheral Interface Bus –
Serial transmission –
Series and parallel circuits –
Shadow loss –
Shannon limit –
Shannon's theorem –
Short circuit –
Shortwave –
Shot noise –
Shrinking generator –
Side lobe –
Sideband –
Sidereal time –
Siemens –
Signal (information theory) –
Signal compression –
Signal processing gain –
Signal processing –
Signal reflection –
Signal transition –
Signal-to-crosstalk ratio –
Signal-to-noise ratio –
Signature block –
Significant condition –
Silicon bandgap temperature sensor –
Silicon –
Simplex circuit –
Simplex signaling –
Sinc filter –
Single frequency networks –
Single-phase electric power –
Single-frequency signaling –
Single-polarized antenna –
Single-sideband modulation –
Skew (antenna) –
Skin effect –
Skip zone –
Skywave –
Slant range –
Slewing –
Slew rate –
Slot antenna –
Slow-scan television –
Software-defined radio –
Solar cell –
Soldering –
Solenoid –
Sound card –
Space diversity –
Space tether –
Spark gap –
Specific detectivity –
Specification –
Speckle pattern –
Spectral width –
Spectrum –
Spectrum analyzer –
Speed of light –
Speed of service –
SPICE –
Spill-forward feature –
Spillover –
Spin glass –
Spot beam –
Spread spectrum –
Spurious emission –
Squelch –
Standard telegraph level –
Standard test signal –
Standard test tone –
Standing wave ratio –
Standing wave –
Starpath Supercharger –
Start signal –
Start-stop transmission –
Static electricity –
Steady-state condition –
Step-index profile –
Stoletov's law –
Stop signal –
Stopband –
Store-and-forward switching center –
Stressed environment –
Strobe light –
Stroke speed –
Subcarrier –
Subtractive synthesis –
Sudden ionospheric disturbance –
Supercomputer –
Superconductivity –
Superheterodyne receiver –
Superparamagnetism –
Superposition theorem –
Supervisory program –
Suppressed carrier transmission –
Surface wave –
Surface-mount technology –
Surveillance device –
Survivability –
S-Video –
Switch –
Switched-mode power supply –
Synchronism –
Synchronization –
Synchronizing –
Synchronous network –
Synchronous optical networking –
Synthesizer –
System integrity –
Systems control

T
Table of standard electrode potentials –
Tactical communications system –
Tactical communications –
Tactical data information link--A –
Tantalum –
Tape relay –
T-carrier –
Technical control facility –
Telecommunication –
Communications –
Telecommunications service –
Teleconference –
Telegrapher's equations –
Telegraphy –
Telemetry –
Telephone tapping –
Teletext –
Teletraining –
Television –
Television reception –
TEMPEST –
Tensor –
Tesla coil –
Tesla patents –
Test antenna –
Tether propulsion –
Thermal noise –
Thermistor –
Thévenin's theorem –
Third-order intercept point –
TNC connector –
Three phase –
Time-assignment speech interpolation –
Time-division multiple access –
Time-division multiplexing –
Time-domain reflectometer –
Time-out –
Tinfoil hat –
Toll switching trunk –
Total harmonic distortion –
Total internal reflection –
Traffic intensity –
Traffic shaping –
Transceiver –
Transcoding –
Transducer –
Transformer –
Transient electromagnetic device –
Transimpedance amplifier –
Transistor radio –
Transistor –
Transistor-transistor logic –
TTL –
Transition metal –
Transmission coefficient –
Transmission level point –
Transmission line –
Transmission medium –
Medium –
Transmit-after-receive time delay –
Transmitter attack-time delay –
Transmitter –
Transmitter-studio link –
Transparent latch –
Transponder –
Transverse redundancy check –
Traveling-wave tube –
TRF –
Triangle wave –
Trimline telephone –
Troposphere –
Tropospheric ducting –
Tropospheric wave –
Tuner –
Twisted pair –
TX

U
Ultra high frequency –
Ultra Wideband –
Ultraviolet –
Unavailability –
Uncertainty principle –
Uniform linear array –
Unijunction transistor –
Unintentional radiator –
Uplink –
Upright position (electronics) –
User (telecommunications)

V
VAC –
Vačkář oscillator –
Vacuum tube –
Valence band –
Variable length buffer –
Varicap –
Varistor –
VDC –
Vector field –
Veroboard –
Very high frequency –
Very-large-scale integration –
VHSIC hardware description language –
Video cassette recorder –
Video Game Console –
Video Game –
Video teleconference –
Video teleconferencing unit –
Video –
Vintage amateur radio –
Virtual circuit capability –
Virtual circuit –
Virtual ground –
Voice frequency primary patch bay –
Voice frequency –
Volt- 
Voltage bias –
Voltage-to-current converter –
Voltmeter –
Vox

W
Wardenclyffe Tower –
Warner exemption –
Watt –
Wave impedance –
Wave propagation –
Wave –
Waveform –
Waveguide antenna –
Waveguide –
Wavelength division multiplexing –
Wavelength –
Wheatstone bridge –
Whip antenna –
White facsimile transmission –
Wideband modem –
Williams tube –
Wink pulsing –
Wire wrap –
Wire –
Wireless access point –
Wireless community network –
Wireless network –
Wireless personal area network –
Wireless –
X-dimension of recorded spot –
XLR connector

Y
Yagi antenna –
Y-delta transform –
YUV

Z
Zero dBm transmission level point –
Zero insertion force (ZIF) –
Zero-dispersion wavelength –
Zigbee –
Zig-zag in-line package –
Zobel network –
Zone melting –
Z-transform

See also
 

Electronics lists
Technology-related lists
Wikipedia indexes